Eua globosa is a species of tropical air-breathing land snail, a terrestrial pulmonate gastropod mollusk in the family Partulidae. It is endemic to the island of 'Eua, Tonga.

Eua globosa is the type species of the genus Eua.

The following cladogram shows the phylogenic relations of Eua globosa:

References

Partulidae
Gastropods described in 1934